Gry Jannicke Jarlum (born April 6, 1962, in Oslo) is a Norwegian-Swedish singer and author, best known for her 1981 album Svake mennesker which was at number one on the VG-lista for 16 weeks. She is also known for her book Du er jeg (1994), about her alleged experience with extraterrestrial life.

References 

1962 births
Living people
20th-century Norwegian women singers
20th-century Norwegian singers
Norwegian writers